Hossein Rezai-Jorabi (born 1956) is a structural engineer based in Singapore. He is the founding principal and director of international design engineering consultancy Web Structures Pte Ltd, a multi-disciplinary firm engaging in structural, civil and geotechnical engineering. Rezai is managing director of the Milan Research Lab; a research and consultancy start up, based in Milan – Italy, dedicated to research in advanced computational design and engineering analysis.

He has been recognised for his contributions to engineering and was named 'Designer of the Year' by Singaporean President Tony Tan in the 2016 President's Design Awards.

Education and academic activities
Rezai obtained his PHD from the University of Westminster and also worked there as a research assistant and fellow. He has written and presented several technical papers and has lectured at the University of Westminster, Politecnico Di Milano, National University of Singapore, Victoria and Albert Museum, Institution of Civil Engineers and Singapore University of Technology and Design.

His works have been published in newspapers, international architecture magazines and books, including the Institution of Structural Engineers' magazine and the Architects' Journal.

Accolades
In 2016, Rezai received the Singapore President's Design Award 'Designer of the Year' – the first engineer to win the award.

Web Structures' awards include the RIBA Award for International Excellence 2012 for The Troika (Kuala Lumpur), the 14th SIA Architectural Design Award 2014 for the National Design Centre, and the ISE Singapore Structural Award 2016 for the Mediacorp Campus building.

Rezai and Web Structures projects have been featured in The Telegraph, The Straits Times, Financial Times, Forbes, Dezeen and more. Rezai has also appeared as a guest expert on Channel News Asia, BBC News and National Geographic.

Rezai was part of the master jury in the 2016 Aga Khan Award for Architecture – the first Singapore professional to be on the jury.

References 

Structural engineers
1956 births
Living people